Isadore Dyer (November 2, 1865 – October 12, 1920) was an American physician.

Early life
He was the son of Isadore Dyer, Sr. (1814–1888) and his wife, born Amelia Ann Lewis. Isadore, Sr. had immigrated to the United States from Germany in 1815; he served in the Mexican-American War and became a banker in Galveston, Texas.

Education
He attended a private school in Galveston, the New York Grammar School, and the Bellevue High School in Bellevue, Virginia. He graduated from Sheffield Scientific School at Yale in 1887, studied at the University of Virginia from 1887 to 1888, and received his M. D. at Tulane in 1889.  After an internship of three years in New York, he served at Tulane in various capacities, becoming professor of diseases of the skin in 1905 and dean of the medical department in 1908.  In 1894 he founded the Louisiana Leper Home, and in 1896 Dr. Dyer became editor of the New Orleans Medical and Surgical Journal.  He was president of the Louisiana State Medical Society (1902–03), vice president of the American Medical Association (1903), vice-president of the New York Medico-Legal-Society (1908–10), and a lieutenant in the United States Army Medical Reserve Corps (1908).  Dr. Dyer was the author of articles in various medical text and reference books.

Family
Dr. Dyer was the nephew of Major Leon Dyer, U.S. Army & Army of the Republic of Texas.

On July 31, 1905 he married Mercedes Louise Percival. They had six children.

Amelia Dyer (died age 12)
Isadore Dyer, Jr. MD;
Alfred Dyer,Sr
Mercedes Dyer
Donal Dyer
John L. Dyer, MD

Death
He died in New Orleans of angina pectoris on October 12, 1920, and was interred in Metairie Cemetery.

Sources

The Handbook of Texas Online

1865 births
1920 deaths
Yale School of Engineering & Applied Science alumni
American dermatologists
University of Virginia alumni
Tulane University School of Medicine alumni